Edmond Stephen Meany (December 28, 1862 – April 22, 1935) was a professor of botany and history at the University of Washington (UW). He was an alumnus of the university, having graduated as the valedictorian of his class in 1885 when it was the Territorial University of Washington. Meany also earned a Master of Science from the University of Washington in 1899, and a Master of Letters from the University of Wisconsin in 1901.

He was elected as a Washington state legislator for the 1891 and 1893 sessions. Meany was an active supporter of the local Boy Scouts of America organization, the Seattle Area Council. From 1906 until his death, he served as managing editor of the Washington Historical Quarterly (renamed the Pacific Northwest Quarterly the year after his death). From 1908 until his death, he also served as president of the Mountaineers, a hiking and climbing club. In 1928 he purchased land in Martin, Washington and donated it to the Mountaineers. The ski lodge built there was named Meany Ski Hut in his honor.

Honors
In 1926 he was awarded an honorary Doctor of Laws from the College of Puget Sound.
Mount Meany in the Olympic Mountains, Meany Crest on Mount Rainier, Meany Hall for the Performing Arts on the Seattle campus of the University of Washington, Camp Meany (a Cub Scout camp on the Olympic Peninsula from 1939 to 1942 and now a part of Camp Parsons), and Meany Middle School in Seattle, Washington are all named in his honor.
The Mountaineers erected the Meany Memorial, a rock seat on Second Burroughs Mountain in Mount Rainier National Park a year after he died.

Writings

Newspapers of Washington Territory in Washington Historical Quarterly

Further reading
Frykman, George A. Seattle's Historian and Promoter: The Life of Edmond Stephen Meany (Pullman, Washington: Washington State University Press, 1998).

Archives
Edmond S. Meany papers. 1877–1935. 71.86 cubic feet.  At the University of Washington Libraries Special Collections.
Clarence Bagley papers. 1864–1931. Approximately 10.33 cubic feet. At the University of Washington Libraries Special Collections.

External links
Edmond S. Meany biography maintained by the University of Washington
Meany tribute on the Sierra Club Website
University of Washington Libraries Digital Collections – Portraits Database An ongoing database of over 300 historical portraits of men and women well known in the Pacific Northwest region and also nationwide. Includes images of Edmond S. Meany.

 
 

1862 births
1935 deaths
University of Washington alumni
Members of the Washington House of Representatives
University of Washington faculty
People from Saginaw, Michigan
Historians from Michigan